Sanyuan Palace is a Taoist temple dedicated to Three Great Emperor-Officials and is located in Yuexiu District of Guangzhou, Guangdong, People's Republic of China.

History 

It was established in the Nanyue Kingdom, at that time it was called "Bei Miao". The temple gradually fell into disuse after the kingdom was collapsed.

In the second year of the age of Daxing of Emperor Yuan of Jin, Nanhai governor Bao Jing revived the temple for his daughter Bao Gu to cultivate Tao while providing medical services to the locals and renamed the temple as "Yuegang Yuan".

During the Tang dynasty, it was converted into a Buddhist temple and renamed "Wuxing Temple".

During the reign of Wanli Emperor, the temple was converted back to a Taoist temple and renamed "Sanyuan Palace". The temple was dedicated to Three Great Emperor-Officials, with another smaller shrine dedicated to Bao Gu.

In 1700, in the period of Kangxi Emperor, Master Du Yangdong became the abbot of the temple and extended the temple.

During the Cultural Revolution, the red guards fanatically smashed up the statues of the deities and valuable cultural relics, then forcefully occupied the temple. All religious activities were abruptly stopped and the temple was closed down.

In July 1982, Guangzhou People's Government reopened the temple and restored it as the status of Taoist temple. It was fully restored by 1990.

In December 1989, it was listed as a municipal culture and relics site.

Cultural relics 
 The stone statue of Guanyin, dated to Tang Dynasty.

Many other valuable cultural relics were destroyed during the Sino-Japanese war and cultural revolution.

References

Bibliography 

 

Religious buildings and structures in Guangzhou
Yuexiu District
Taoist temples in Guangdong
Tourist attractions in Guangzhou